Earle F. Zeigler (August 20, 1919 – September 29, 2018) was an American–Canadian academic who was one of the founders of modern American Sport Studies.

Life 
Zeigler was born in August 1919 in New York City. After high school he received a BA (German major) from the Bates College in Lewiston, Maine. From 1941-43 he worked as swim coach and director of watersports for the YMCA in Bridgeport, Connecticut. From 1943 until 1949 he was on the faculty of  Yale University, where he received his MA (German) and his PhD (Education).  He taught Theory of Physical Education, football and Wrestling as well as German at the University of Connecticut.  In 1949 he moved to the University of Western Ontario, in London, Ont. where he taught German and from 1950 onward he was the Director of Physical Education also instructing  Football, Wrestling and Swimming. From here he moved on to the University of Michigan (1956 – 1963),  and the University of Illinois, Champaign, IL (1963 – 1971) where he was the Head of the Physical Education department. In 1971 he became the founding Dean of the Faculty of Physical Education of the University of Western Ontario (until 1989).

From his retirement he continued to lecture and publish. The WorldCat has 269 books of him and he has authored almost five hundred learned articles. In the more recent one he is criticizing physical education for losing focus and not using its full potential to help with the diverse illnesses of modern civilization. In his retirement he lived in British Columbia. He died in September 2018 at the age of 99 in Richmond, British Columbia.

Honors 
1955–56 Vice-President, Canadian Association for Health, Physical Education, and Recreation 
1966 Fellow National Academy of Kinesiology
1974–75 President,  Philosophic Society for the Study of Sport (today International Association for Sport Philosophy) 
1975 Dr. h.c. University of Windsor, Canada
1977 Alliance Scholar-of-the-Year (AAHPERD)
1981–82 President, National Academy of Kinesiology 
1983–85 Vice-President for Communications, Canadian Association for Health, Physical Education, Recreation and Dance 
1988 Beginning of the Annual  Earle Zeigler Lecture North American Society for Sport Management 
1986 Honorary Past President, American Society for Sport Management
1988 Distinguished Service Award, International Society for Comparative Physical Education and Sport 
1989  North Hetherington Award Recipients der NAK
1990 Gulick-Medal der AAHPERD
1991 Beginning of the Annual Earle Zeigler – Honorary Lecture at Western University
1997 Dr. h.c. University of Lethbridge
2006 Dr. h.c. University of Western Ontario, London, Ont.

References

1919 births
2018 deaths
Canadian educational theorists
Canadian university and college faculty deans
American emigrants to Canada
Sports historians
University of Illinois Urbana-Champaign faculty
University of Michigan faculty
Academic staff of the University of Western Ontario
Yale Graduate School of Arts and Sciences alumni
Yale University faculty
People from New York City